Qinghua Donglu Xikou station is a station on Line 15 of the Beijing Subway.

An infill station on Line 13, between the existing  and  stations, is under planning and will start construction at the same time with the Line 13 split project. After the construction is completed, the station will be a transfer station on Line 13 and Line 15.

Station Layout
The station has 2 underground side platforms.

Exits
There are 2 exits, lettered B and C. Exit C is accessible.

Gallery

References

Beijing Subway stations in Haidian District